The 2007–08 Serbian First League (referred to as the Prva Liga Telekom Srbija for sponsorship reasons) was the third season of the league under its current title.

League table

Playoffs

3rd to 6th place playoffs

Promotion playoffs

Relegation playoffs

Top scorers

External links
 Official website
 Football Association of Serbia

Serbian First League seasons
2007–08 in Serbian football leagues
Serbia